George James Demas (January 7, 1907 — November 16, 1977) was a professional American football guard in the National Football League. He played for the Staten Island Stapletons and the Brooklyn Dodgers as well as the Philadelphia Eagles in 1933. He attended high school at Allegheny Prep in Pittsburgh and The Kiski School in Saltsburg, Pennsylvania.  He attended Washington & Jefferson College.

Notes
 

1907 births
1977 deaths
Sportspeople from Johnstown, Pennsylvania
Players of American football from Pennsylvania
American football offensive guards
Washington & Jefferson College alumni
Washington & Jefferson Presidents football players
Staten Island Stapletons players
Brooklyn Dodgers (NFL) players